Taklak  (Talak) is a village development committee in Parbat District in the Dhawalagiri Zone of central Nepal. At the time of the 1991 Nepal census it had a population of 1,515 people living in 270 individual households.

References

External links
 

Populated places in Parbat District